Cosimo Sarli (born 13 March 1979) is a well-travelled Italian footballer who plays as a striker. He is nicknamed "Cobra".

Career
Born in Corigliano Calabro,  Sarli began his professional career at Torino but failed to break into the first team. After spells outside Italy with Southampton (England), Eendracht Aalst (Belgium) and Nice (France), he returned to his home country, spending most of his career in the lower divisions.

In 2000, he joined Crotone in Serie B, where he scored 3 goals in 23 appearances. His career continued in the lower divisions (Serie C2 and Serie D) with various clubs, including Cosenza, Scafatese, Aversa Normanna, Siracusa and Casertana.

On 20 July 2011, he moved to Ischia in Serie D.

References

External links

Interview with Sarli on prospects for Ischia 

1979 births
Living people
People from Corigliano Calabro
Italian footballers
Association football forwards
Torino F.C. players
Southampton F.C. players
OGC Nice players
F.C. Crotone players
A.C. Montichiari players
A.C. Legnano players
S.S.D. Pro Sesto players
A.S. Cosenza Calcio players
S.S. Scafatese Calcio 1922 players
U.S. Catanzaro 1929 players
U.S. Siracusa players
A.C.R. Messina players
S.F. Aversa Normanna players
Sportspeople from the Province of Cosenza
Footballers from Calabria